State Route 168 (SR 168) is a  route in the northeastern part of the state.  The western terminus of the route is at its junction with SR 75 at Douglas.  The eastern terminus of the route is at its junction with SR 68 approximately eight miles northeast of Boaz in southwestern DeKalb County.

Route description
SR 168 is aligned along a two-lane road for its duration.  From its western origin at Douglas in southeastern Marshall County, the route travels eastwardly as it leads towards Boaz.  At Boaz, the route turns northeastwardly, crossing US 431 and leading into DeKalb County.  The eastern terminus of the route is at Kilpatrick, an unincorporated community near the border of DeKalb and Marshall Counties.

SR 168 passes several outlet malls near downtown Boaz.  The malls are located west of the junction between US 431 and SR 168.

Major intersections

References

168
Transportation in DeKalb County, Alabama
Transportation in Marshall County, Alabama